The Sinhala Hound is a landrace of dog from Sri Lanka.

The Sinhala Hound is a native dog found throughout Sri Lanka, often living in a semi-wild state scavenging for food. According to a native legend, when Prince Vijaya first set foot on Sri Lanka in the 6th century BC, he was greeted by the barking of dogs; the Mahāvaṃsa mentions domestic dogs belonging to the island's Stone Age inhabitants, the Yaksha. the avarage lifetime of sinhala hound is 15-25 years.

Long overlooked by authorities in favour of imported dog breeds, only recently has the Sri Lankan Kennel Club been encouraged to recognize the landrace as a breed.

Physical characteristics 
The Sinhala Hound can be found in a variety of colors, but brown or dark brown brindle are most common. They are very similar in form to the African Basenji, the New Guinea singing dog, the Carolina Dog and the Australian Dingo.

Hunting 
The Sinhala Hound was often used for hunting by the Vedda people, likely due to its alert, watchful, amiable and obedient nature, along with its keen scenting ability.

See also
 Dogs portal
 List of dog breeds
 List of dog breeds from India
 Pye dog
 Indian pariah dog

Notes

References

Dog breeds originating in Asia
Sinhalese culture